This article is a record of South Korea's results at the CONCACAF Gold Cup. The CONCACAF Gold Cup is North America's major tournament, but nations from other confederations could enter the Gold Cup as invitees in select editions. 

South Korea participated in the 2000 and 2002 tournament to prepare for the 2002 FIFA World Cup hosted by them. They and Qatar are the only Asian teams to ever participate in the North American continental championships. In seven matches, South Korea failed to win a single one in regular time, but won fourth place in 2002 after advancing to the knockout stage with only one point to their name and defeating Mexico on penalties in the quarter-finals. Two years prior, they were eliminated after the group stage per coin toss. Canada advanced instead and eventually won the 2000 edition.

Competitive record

Player records

Most appearances

Lee Young-pyo is the only player who was fielded in all seven of South Korea's Gold Cup matches. In 2002, Song Chong-gug was the only player to play through the entirety of Korea's fourth-place-run. In the same year, Kim Nam-il was voted into the tournament's Best XI, becoming the first and only Asian player to be honoured at a North American continental championship.

Top goalscorers
Five players have scored one goal each at the tournaments. Three of them have been scored against Costa Rica.

Details

2000 (United States)

2002 (United States)

See also
South Korea national football team
History of the South Korea national football team
South Korea at the FIFA World Cup
South Korea at the AFC Asian Cup

References

External links
RSSSF archives and results
Soccerway database

Countries at the CONCACAF Gold Cup
South Korea national football team